In probability theory and statistics, the generalized extreme value (GEV) distribution is a family of continuous probability distributions developed within extreme value theory to combine the Gumbel, Fréchet and Weibull families also known as type I, II and III extreme value distributions. By the extreme value theorem the GEV distribution is the only possible limit distribution of properly normalized maxima of a sequence of independent and identically distributed random variables. Note that a limit distribution needs to exist, which requires regularity conditions on the tail of the distribution.  Despite this, the GEV distribution is often used as an approximation to model the maxima of long (finite) sequences of random variables.

In some fields of application the generalized extreme value distribution is known as the Fisher–Tippett distribution, named after Ronald Fisher and L. H. C. Tippett who recognised three different forms outlined below. However usage of this name is sometimes restricted to mean the special case of the Gumbel distribution.  The origin of the common functional form for all 3 distributions dates back to at least Jenkinson, A. F. (1955), though allegedly it could also have been given by von Mises, R. (1936).

Specification

where  the shape parameter, can be any real number.

In the special case of  so  and  ≈  for whatever values  and  might have.

The probability density function of the standardized distribution is

In the case  the density is positive on the whole real line.

Since the cumulative distribution function is invertible, the quantile function for the GEV distribution has an explicit expression, namely

and therefore the quantile density function  is

Summary statistics
Some simple statistics of the distribution are:

 for 

The skewness is for ξ>0

For ξ<0, the sign of the numerator is reversed.

The excess kurtosis is:

Link to Fréchet, Weibull and Gumbel families
The shape parameter  governs the tail behavior of the distribution.
 Gumbel or type I extreme value distribution

 Fréchet or type II extreme value distribution, if  and 

 Reversed Weibull or type III extreme value distribution, if  and  

The subsections below remark on properties of these distributions.

Modification for minima rather than maxima

The theory here relates to data maxima and the distribution being discussed is an extreme value distribution for maxima. A generalised extreme value distribution for data minima can be obtained, for example by substituting (−x) for x in the distribution function, and subtracting from one: this yields a separate family of distributions.

Alternative convention for the Weibull distribution

The ordinary Weibull distribution arises in reliability applications and is obtained from the distribution here by using the variable , which gives a strictly positive support - in contrast to the use in the extreme value theory here. This arises because the ordinary Weibull distribution is used in cases that deal with data minima rather than data maxima. The distribution here has an addition parameter compared to the usual form of the Weibull distribution and, in addition, is reversed so that the distribution has an upper bound rather than a lower bound. Importantly, in applications of the GEV, the upper bound is unknown and so must be estimated, while when applying the ordinary Weibull distribution in reliability applications the lower bound is usually known to be zero.

Ranges of the distributions

Note the differences in the ranges of interest for the three extreme value distributions: Gumbel is unlimited, Fréchet has a lower limit, while the reversed Weibull has an upper limit.
More precisely, Extreme Value Theory (Univariate Theory) describes which of the three is the limiting law according to the initial law X and in particular depending on its tail.

Distribution of log variables

One can link the type I to types II and III in the following way: if the cumulative distribution function of some random variable  is of type II, and with the positive numbers as support, i.e.

Link to logit models (logistic regression)
Multinomial logit models, and certain other types of logistic regression, can be phrased as latent variable models with error variables distributed as Gumbel distributions (type I generalized extreme value distributions).  This phrasing is common in the theory of discrete choice models, which include logit models, probit models, and various extensions of them, and derives from the fact that the difference of two type-I GEV-distributed variables follows a logistic distribution, of which the logit function is the quantile function.  The type-I GEV distribution thus plays the same role in these logit models as the normal distribution does in the corresponding probit models.

Properties
The cumulative distribution function of the generalized extreme value distribution solves the stability postulate equation. The generalized extreme value distribution is a special case of a max-stable distribution, and is a transformation of a min-stable distribution.

Applications
The GEV distribution is widely used in the treatment of "tail risks" in fields ranging from insurance to finance. In the latter case, it has been considered as a means of assessing various financial risks via metrics such as value at risk.

However, the resulting shape parameters have been found to lie in the range leading to undefined means and variances, which underlines the fact that reliable data analysis is often impossible.

 In hydrology the GEV distribution is applied to extreme events such as annual maximum one-day rainfalls and river discharges. The blue picture, made with CumFreq, illustrates an example of fitting the GEV distribution to ranked annually maximum one-day rainfalls showing also the 90% confidence belt based on the binomial distribution. The rainfall data are represented by plotting positions as part of the cumulative frequency analysis.

Example for Normally distributed variables
Let  be i.i.d. normally distributed random variables with mean 0 and variance 1.
The Fisher–Tippett–Gnedenko theorem tells us that
,
where

.

This allow us to estimate e.g. the mean of 
from the mean of the GEV distribution:

where  is the Euler–Mascheroni constant.

Related distributions

 If  then 
 If  (Gumbel distribution) then 
 If  (Weibull distribution) then 
 If  then  (Weibull distribution)
 If  (Exponential distribution) then 
 If  and  then  (see Logistic_distribution).
 If  and  then  (The sum is not a logistic distribution). Note that .

Proofs

4.

5.

See also
Extreme value theory (univariate theory)
Fisher–Tippett–Gnedenko theorem
Generalized Pareto distribution
German tank problem, opposite question of population maximum given sample maximum
Pickands–Balkema–De Haan theorem

References

Further reading
 
 
 
 

Continuous distributions
Extreme value data
Location-scale family probability distributions
Stability (probability)